Aluminum Tunes is a double album collection of EPs and rarities from Stereolab, released in 1998. It is the third compilation in a series of rarities collections following Switched On and Refried Ectoplasm, and was stickered with the subtitle "Switched On, Volume 3".

Track listing

CD 1
 "Pop Quiz" - 4:22 (from the 1995 Music for the Amorphous Body Study Center EP)
 "The Extension Trip" - 3:43 (from the 1995 Music for the Amorphous Body Study Center EP)
 "How to Play Your Internal Organs Overnight" 3:58 (from the 1995 Music for the Amorphous Body Study Center EP)
 "The Brush Descends the Length" - 3:08 (from the 1995 Music for the Amorphous Body Study Center EP)
 "Melochord Seventy-Five" - 3:39 (from the 1995 Music for the Amorphous Body Study Center EP)
 "Space Moment" - 4:20 (from the 1995 Music for the Amorphous Body Study Center EP) (also includes the unlisted track - an instrumental reprise of "The Extension Trip" - that followed "Space Moment" on the original EP)
 "Iron Man" - 3:27 (from the 1997 Iron Man single)
 "The Long Hair of Death" - 4:48 (from the 1995 split single with Yo La Tengo)
 "You Used to Call Me Sadness" - 4:00 (from the 1996 split single with Füxa, on Lissy's Records)
 "New Orthophony" [full version] - 6:26 (the version on Mars Audiac Quintet is 4:34)
 "Speedy Car" - 5:00 (from the 1996 split single with Tortoise)
 "Golden Atoms" - 5:18 (recorded June 1995, also known as "Aluminum Tune" from the 1998 The In Sound single)
 "Ulan Bator" - 3:14 (from the 1994 Mars Audiac Quintet bonus disc)
 "One Small Step" - 4:16 (from the 1996 Laminations EP)

CD 2
 "One Note Samba / Surfboard" [full version] - Stereolab + Herbie Mann - 9:10 (the version on Red Hot + Rio is 7:18)
 "Cadriopo" - 3:09 (from the 1996 Laminations EP)
 "Klang Tone" - 5:36 (from the 1994 Mars Audiac Quintet bonus disc)
 "Get Carter" - 3:23
 "1000 Miles an Hour" - 4:32 (from the 1998 The In Sound single)
 "Percolations" - 3:22 (from the 1996 split single with Faust and Foetus)
 "Seeperbold" - 5:08
 "Check and Double Check" - 4:03 (from the 1996 Laminations EP)
 "Munich Madness" - 3:48 (also known as "Blue Milk" from the 1998 The In Sound single)
 "Metronomic Underground" [Wagon Christ Mix] - 7:51  (from the 1996 Laminations EP)
 "The Incredible He Woman" - 3:31 (from the 1997 Iron Man single)

References

1998 compilation albums
Stereolab compilation albums
Drag City (record label) compilation albums